The Real World: Cancun is the twenty-second season of MTV's reality television series The Real World, which focuses on a group of diverse strangers living together for several months in a different city each season, as cameras follow their lives and interpersonal relationships. It is the only season of The Real World to be filmed in Mexico.

The season featured eight people who lived in a hotel converted into a suite. It is the fourth season of The Real World to be set outside the United States, after The Real World: London in 1995, The Real World: Paris in 2003, and The Real World: Sydney in 2007. Series co-creator Jonathan Murray explained the choice of Cancun, saying, "Cancun is a good one to do after Brooklyn, which was a more gritty environment."

Primary production started from January 26 to April 2009 and was not affected by the swine flu outbreak in Mexico. Executive Producer Jim Johnston said, "We had stopped production before this thing reared its ugly head." Consisting of 12 episodes, the season premiered June 24 of that year and was viewed by 1.4 million viewers, the smallest debut ever for a season of The Real World at the time. The American synthpop band LMFAO has a guest appearance in Episode 7, which ties into the cast's work assignment.

The show's theme, heard during the opening titles, is called "Sex on the Beach" and performed by 3OH!3.

Bunim-Murray Productions also shot an unscripted 2003 movie called The Real Cancun, although it was unrelated to the series. This season's suite was used by the cast of The Real World: Las Vegas (2011) for their season vacation.

Assignment
Most seasons of The Real World, beginning with its fifth season, have included the assignment of a season-long group job or task to the housemates, continued participation in which has been mandatory to remain part of the cast since the Back to New York season. The Cancun cast was assigned to work with StudentCity, an organization that helps visiting college students and, as Jonathan Murray put it, "give people a safe and fun vacation."

The residence

The cast stayed at the ME Cancun resort (now called Melody Maker Cancún) at Boulevard Kukulkan, km. 12 in Cancun, Mexico. The resort is located in the hotel zone between the Beach Palace and Park Royal Piramides resorts. Fifteen hotel rooms were converted into the cast's suite: eleven on the second floor, and four rooms on the third floor. Production Designer Chuck Aubrey used the hotel's signature furnishings to decorate the suite, along with the vivid colors that are typically used by the Real World production to adorn the residences. The suite, like all of the resort's other 418 rooms, features an ocean and sunset lagoon view. The suite is currently available to the public under the name SuiteMe. The suite was later used as the vacation residence for the cast of the 2011 Las Vegas season, as seen in Episode 11 of that season.

Cast
The cast is made up of eight individuals, in line with the prior season. Two of the cast members, Jonna Mannion and Derek Chavez, previously worked together at a bar in Tempe, Arizona, and are the first set of cast members in a season to be acquainted with one another prior to casting, since David Burns and Nathan Blackburn from The Real World: Seattle.

: Age at time of filming.

Episodes

After filming
The Real World: Cancun Reunion aired on September 16, 2009, and was hosted by Maria Menounos. Since filming ended, CJ planned to pursue his football dreams as well as a possible TV show in Miami, Derek and Jonna returned to working together in Phoenix, though Jonna stated that they planned to move to California and she planned to pursue fashion. Ayiiia, who stated that she entered a serious relationship with another woman, enjoyed time living with her mother in San Diego, though she planned to move into a house of her own. Emilee planned to move to New York City with Jasmine, and stated that she no longer works for Hooters, while Joey returned to Boston and continued to play shows with his band. Jasmine returned to Houston and continued to pursue professional cheerleading and teaching.

The cast discussed how their lives changed following the conclusion of their experience, Joey's sexual dalliance with Ayiiia in the season finale, and some of the arguments that took place among the cast. An upset Emilee briefly left the set, and then returned and argued with Joey over her singling out the men for their behavior. Jonna's flirtatious behavior, and her relationship with Pat were also discussed, as was Jasmine's feelings for him. Derek and Bronne's close friendship was discussed. Joey left the reunion early due to a prior commitment with his band. Ayiiia's romantic and sexual encounters with her female roommates were discussed. Ayiiia and Jonna explained that they are not close, due to differences that developed between them during filming. LMFAO make a special appearance on the reunion set, and concluded the reunion with a performance of their newest single "La La La".

On December 23, 2015, Jasmine welcomed her first daughter, Madelyn Eva, followed by her first son in January 2018. On August 3, 2016, Jonna gave birth to a daughter, Naleigh J. She got married in 2019 and welcomed her first son in the following year.

In 2011, Joey Rozmus appeared on the movie Living Will.

CJ Koegel is a model and a personal trainer. On September 13, 2019, he married fellow trainer Bree Branker. In 2020, their first son was born.

Emilee Fitzpatrick made her acting debut in the 2020 movie Habitual, which also featured Chris Tamburello from The Real World: Paris and Sabrina Kennedy from Real World: Go Big or Go Home.

The Challenge

Challenges in bold indicate the cast member was a finalist on the Challenge.
Note: Jonna Mannion was originally cast for Fresh Meat II, but did not compete due to a lost passport.

References

External links
The Real World: Cancun at mtv.com
Cast bio page at mtv.com

Cancun
2009 American television seasons
Television shows set in Cancún
2009 in Mexican television
2000s Mexican television series
Television shows filmed in Mexico